= Rosers Run =

Stream in Ohio, U.S.

Coordinates: 39°31′04″N 84°10′50″W

Rosers Run is a stream in the U.S. state of Ohio.

Rosers Run was named in honor of a local family.
